National TV or national television may refer to:

Nine Network, formerly known as National Television Network
Public broadcasting, media operated as a public service, and often financed by public funds
State media, media under financial and/or editorial control by a government or state entity

See also 
List of public broadcasters by country
List of television networks by country
Național TV on the Romanian Wikipedia